Gonzalo Andrés Tapia Dubournais (born 18 February 2002) is a Chilean professional footballer who plays as a forward for Chilean club Universidad Católica.

Club career
Tapia debuted the year 2020 in the match against Coquimbo Unido in San Carlos de Apoquindo, on the following date.

International career
At early age, he represented Chile at under-15 level in the 2017 South American U-15 Championship and Chile U17 at the 2019 South American U-17 Championship and at the 2019 FIFA U-17 World Cup. In addition, he represented Chile U20 in a friendly tournament played in Teresópolis (Brazil) called Granja Comary International Tournament, scoring in all matches against Peru U20, Bolivia U20, and Brazil U20.

Later, he was called up to the first training microcycle of the Chile senior team on 2021.

He represented Chile at under-23 level in a 1–0 win against Peru U23 on 31 August 2022, in the context of preparations for the 2023 Pan American Games.

Career statistics

Club

Honours

Club
Universidad Católica
 Primera División: 2020, 2021
 Supercopa de Chile: 2020, 2021

References

External links
 

2002 births
Living people
People from Santiago Province, Chile
Footballers from Santiago
Chilean footballers
Chile youth international footballers
Chile under-20 international footballers
Chilean Primera División players
Club Deportivo Universidad Católica footballers
Association football forwards